Ion Lowndes Farris (September 14, 1878 – November 10, 1934) was an American politician and attorney from the state of Florida. He served as both a member of the Florida House of Representatives and the Florida Senate. He served twice as the speaker of the Florida House of Representatives at a time when the legislature met only once every two years, in both 1909 and 1913, and president of the Florida Senate in 1913. He was an ardent supporter of former Governor of Florida Napoleon Broward, and led the effort to get Broward County named after him. He also led efforts to reduce the number of committees in the Senate. In 1916, he made a run for governor, but lost the Democrat primary. However, he led efforts to drain the Everglades, and forced the other candidates to take a position on the issue.

Life
Farris was born in 1878 in Savannah, Georgia. While he was still a child, he moved to Marion County, Florida, with his family. Farris dropped out of high school to enter the workplace; he first went to work with his father as a boilermaker. He studied stenography and later began an apprenticeship with a law firm.

He moved to Jacksonville, Florida, at 21, and lived there the rest of his life. He married Allie Liddell in January 1901, and had three children with her; his youngest child was named for William Jennings Bryan, with whom he had a close friendship. His nephew, C. Farris Bryant, became the 34th governor of Florida.

Legal career
Farris began his legal education studying at the law offices of Herbert Anderson and W.K. Zewadski. After his studies, he passed the bar exam and became an attorney. He specialized as a criminal defense lawyer.

Political career

Florida House
Farris was first elected to the Florida House of Representatives in 1907, taking over the seat previously held by Henry Holland Buckman. He served until 1909, when Frank E. Butler took over for the 1911 term. He returned to the House in 1913. He served as the speaker of the Florida House of Representatives twice, in both 1909 and 1913, at a time when the Florida Legislature met only once every two years. At the time, he was the youngest person to ever hold the position. In the 1913 bid for the position, he ran with no opposition. As speaker, he amended the bill that formed Broward County, Florida, to honor former Governor Broward, changing it from its original intended name of Everglades County.

Florida Senate
After leaving the House in 1913, Farris successfully ran for the Florida Senate that same year. Once there, he sponsored efforts to remove a number of committees and reorganize the lawmaking the process into what he saw as a more streamlined effort. He sat on multiple committees, including the Judiciary B, Temperance, and Municipality Committees.

Gubernatorial run
Farris ran for governor of Florida in 1916. His campaign slogan was "Back to Broward", referring to the policies of former Governor Napoleon Bonaparte Broward, and his platform included draining the Everglades so that the land could be commercially developed. Farris lost the Democrat primary, but forced the other candidates in the race to address the drainage, successfully making it an election issue.

Political views
Farris identified as a progressive. He advocated for home rule and sponsored legislation that gave local governments greater control over their own organization.

References

External links
One of Farris' 1916 Gubernatorial Race advertisements

1878 births
1934 deaths
Criminal defense lawyers
Florida lawyers
Democratic Party Florida state senators
Politicians from Jacksonville, Florida
Politicians from Savannah, Georgia
Presidents of the Florida Senate
Speakers of the Florida House of Representatives
Democratic Party members of the Florida House of Representatives
American boilermakers